The 2022 Dubai Tennis Championships (also known as the Dubai Duty Free Tennis Championships for sponsorship reasons) was an ATP 500 event on the 2022 ATP Tour and a WTA 500 tournament on the 2022 WTA Tour. Both events were held at the Aviation Club Tennis Centre in Dubai, United Arab Emirates. The women's tournament took place from February 14 to 19 and the men's tournament from February 21 to 26.

Points and prize money

Point distribution

Prize money

*per team

Champions

Men's singles

  Andrey Rublev def.  Jiří Veselý 6–3, 6–4

Women's singles

  Jeļena Ostapenko def.  Veronika Kudermetova, 6–0, 6–4

Men's doubles

  Tim Pütz /  Michael Venus def.  Nikola Mektić /  Mate Pavić, 6–3, 6–7(5–7), [16–14]

Women's doubles

  Veronika Kudermetova /  Elise Mertens def.  Lyudmyla Kichenok /  Jeļena Ostapenko 6–1, 6–3

ATP singles main-draw entrants

Seeds 

 Rankings are as of February 14, 2022.

Other entrants 
The following players received wildcards into the singles main draw:
  Malek Jaziri 
  Andy Murray 
  Lorenzo Musetti

The following players received entry from the qualifying draw:
  Ričardas Berankis 
  Taro Daniel 
  Christopher O'Connell
  Jiří Veselý

The following players received entry as lucky losers:
  Alex Molčan
  Alexei Popyrin

Withdrawals 
Before the tournament
  Félix Auger-Aliassime → replaced by  Alexei Popyrin
  Borna Ćorić → replaced by  Jan-Lennard Struff
  Gaël Monfils → replaced by  Kwon Soon-woo
  Botic van de Zandschulp → replaced by  Alex Molčan

ATP doubles main-draw entrants

Seeds 

 Rankings are as of February 14, 2022.

Other entrants
The following pairs received wildcards into the doubles main draw:
  Abdulrahman Al Janahi /  Omar Alawadhi 
  Saketh Myneni /  Ramkumar Ramanathan

The following pair received entry from the qualifying draw:
  Alexander Bublik /  Altuğ Çelikbilek

The following pairs received entry as lucky losers:
  Dan Evans /  Ken Skupski
  Jonathan Erlich /  Jan-Lennard Struff

Withdrawals 
 Before the tournament
  Marin Čilić /  Ivan Dodig → replaced by  Jonathan Erlich /  Jan-Lennard Struff
  Karen Khachanov /  Andrey Rublev → replaced by  Dan Evans /  Ken Skupski

WTA singles main-draw entrants

Seeds 

 Rankings are as of February 7, 2022.

Other entrants
The following players received wildcards into the singles main draw:
  Caroline Garcia 
  Alison Riske
  Mayar Sherif
  Vera Zvonareva

The following player received special exempts into the main draw:
  Irina-Camelia Begu

The following players received entry from the qualifying draw:
  Varvara Gracheva
  Marta Kostyuk
  Elena-Gabriela Ruse
  Kateřina Siniaková
  Markéta Vondroušová
  Dayana Yastremska

The following players received entry as lucky losers:
  Jil Teichmann
  Ajla Tomljanović

Withdrawals 
 Before the tournament
  Belinda Bencic → replaced by  Veronika Kudermetova
  Angelique Kerber → replaced by  Elise Mertens
  Anett Kontaveit → replaced by  Ajla Tomljanović
  Anastasia Pavlyuchenkova → replaced by  Camila Giorgi
  Karolína Plíšková → replaced by  Jeļena Ostapenko
  Elena Rybakina → replaced by  Danielle Collins
  Maria Sakkari → replaced by  Jil Teichmann
 During the tournament
  Markéta Vondroušová (right adductor injury)

Retirements 
  Danielle Collins (dizziness)

WTA doubles main-draw entrants

Seeds 

 Rankings are as of February 7, 2022.

Other entrants
The following pairs received wildcards into the doubles main draw:
  Lucie Hradecká /  Sania Mirza 
  Eden Silva /  Kimberley Zimmermann

Withdrawals
Before the tournament
  Alexa Guarachi /  Nicole Melichar-Martinez → replaced by  Alexa Guarachi /  Darija Jurak Schreiber

References

External links
 Official website

2022
2022 ATP Tour
2022 WTA Tour
 
2022 in Emirati sport
February 2022 sports events in the United Arab Emirates